Latin syntax is the part of Latin grammar that covers such matters as word order, the use of cases, tenses and moods, and the construction of simple and compound sentences, also known as periods.

The study of Latin syntax in a systematic way was particularly a feature of the late 19th century, especially in Germany. For example, in the 3rd edition of Gildersleeve's Latin Grammar (1895), the reviser, Gonzalez Lodge, mentions 38 scholars whose works have been used in its revision; of these 31 wrote in German, five in English and two in French. (The English scholars include Roby and Lindsay).

In the twentieth century, the German tradition was continued with the publication of two very comprehensive grammars: the Ausführliche Grammatik der lateinischen Sprache by Raphael Kühner and Karl Stegmann (1912, first edition 1879), and the Lateinische Grammatik by Manu Leumann, J.B. Hofmann, and Anton Szantyr (revised edition Munich 1977, first edition 1926). Among works published in English may be mentioned E.C. Woodcock's A New Latin Syntax (1959). More recently, taking advantage of computerised texts, three major works have been published on Latin word order, one by the American scholars Andrew Devine and Laurence Stephens (2006), and two (adopting a different approach) by the Czech scholar Olga Spevak (2010 and 2014).

Latin word order

Latin word order is relatively free. There are also stylistic differences between Latin authors; for example, while Caesar always writes  'he sets up camp', Livy more often writes . 

There are however certain constraints; for example, in prose a monosyllabic preposition such as in 'in' generally precedes its noun (e.g.  'in Italy'). Moreover, even though adjectives can both precede and follow the noun, there is a tendency for different kinds of adjectives to take different positions; for example adjectives of size usually come before the noun ( 'in a loud voice', rarely ), while 'modifiers that are more important than their noun or that specify it' (e.g.  'the Appian Way') usually follow it.

To explain Latin word order there are two main schools of thought. One, represented by Devine and Stephens (2006), argues from the point of view of generative grammar, and maintains that Latin prose has a basic underlying "neutral" word order, from which authors deviate for reasons of emphasis, topicalisation, rhythm, and so on. According to Devine and Stephens, the basic order in broad scope focus sentences is as follows:

Subject – Direct Object – Indirect Object / Oblique Argument – Adjunct – Goal or Source Argument – Non-Referential Direct Object – Verb

The other approach, represented by Panhuis (1982) and Olga Spevak (2010), examines Latin word order from the point of view of functional grammar. Rejecting the idea that there is a basic word order, this approach seeks to explain word order in terms of pragmatic factors, such as topic and focus, and semantic ones (1st person before 2nd, human before animals or things, agent before patient, etc.).

Examples of word order

The order of words is often chosen according to the emphasis required by the author. One way of emphasising a word is to reverse the usual order. For example, in the opening sentence of Caesar's Gallic War, the usual order of numeral and noun trīs partīs 'three parts' is reversed to emphasise the number 'three':

'Gaul, considered as a whole, is divided into three (parts)'

Another technique used by Latin authors is to separate a phrase and put another word or phrase in the middle, for example:
 
'for he was carrying with him a large sum of money'

The technical term for this kind of separation is "hyperbaton" (Greek for 'stepping over'); it is described by Devine and Stephens as 'perhaps the most distinctively alien feature of Latin word order'.

Placing the verb at or near the beginning of a clause sometimes indicates that the action is sudden or unexpected:

'immediately several men, (armed) with weapons, launch an attack on my client from higher ground'

Splitting up an adjective-noun phrase and bringing the adjective to the beginning of the sentence can highlight it. In the following example from Cicero, the splitting of  'blood-stained' and  'dagger' creates a dramatic effect:

'immediately, raising high the blood-stained dagger, Brutus shouted out "Cicero" by name'

Considerations of rhythm and elegance also play a part in Latin word order. For example, Pliny the Younger begins a letter as follows:

'it is a great crop of poets this year has brought'

In this sentence, the object ( 'a great crop of poets') has been brought forward to highlight it. The other striking feature is the order  for the more usual  'this year'. Two reasons which might be suggested are Pliny's fondness for ending a sentence with the rhythm − u − − u − and also no doubt because of the elegant assonance of the vowels a-u-i a-u-i in the last three words.

Gender and number

Gender and number agreement
Latin has three genders (masculine, feminine, and neuter) and two numbers (singular and plural). Pronouns, adjectives, participles, and the numbers one to three have to agree in gender and number with the noun they refer to:

Masculine : : 'this is my son'
Feminine :  : 'this is my daughter'
Neuter : : 'this is my body'

The same three genders are also found in the plural:

Masculine :  : 'these are my sons'
Feminine :  : 'these are my daughters'
Neuter : : 'these things are mine'

In Latin, words referring to males are always masculine, words referring to females are usually feminine. Words referring to things can be any of the three genders, for example  'mountain' (masculine),  'tree' (feminine),  'name' (neuter). However, there are certain rules; for example, nouns with the suffixes -a (unless referring to men), -tiō, -tās are feminine; the names of trees, islands, and countries, such as  'pine',  'Cyprus', and  'Egypt' are also usually feminine, and so on. Some nouns such as  'parent' can vary between masculine and feminine and are called of "common" gender.

When words of different genders are combined, the adjective is usually masculine if referring to people, neuter if referring to things:
 (Terence)
'my father and mother are dead (masc.)'
 (Livy)
'the wall (masc.) and gate (fem.) had been struck (neut. pl.) by lightning' (lit. 'touched from the sky')

However, sometimes the adjective may agree with the nearest noun.

Latin cases

Nouns, pronouns, and adjectives in Latin change their endings according to their function in the sentence. The different endings are called different 'cases'. Case endings of a similar kind are also found in other languages, such as Ancient and Modern Greek, German, Russian, Hungarian, Finnish, Sanskrit, Armenian, Classical Arabic, and Turkish.

The six cases most commonly used in Latin and their main meanings are given below. The cases are presented here in the order Nom, Voc, Acc, Gen, Dat, Abl, which has been used in Britain and countries influenced by Britain ever since the publication of Kennedy's Latin Primer in the 19th century. A different order – Nom, Gen, Dat, Acc, Voc, Abl, or its variation Nom, Gen, Dat, Acc, Abl, Voc – is used in many European countries and the United States.

Nominative :  : 'the/a king' (Subject, or Complement (e.g. 'he is the king'))
Vocative :  : 'o king!'
Accusative :  : 'the king' (Object, or Goal)
Genitive :  : 'of the king'
Dative :  : 'to the king', 'for that king'
Ablative :  : 'with the king' (also 'by, from, in')

(A small line, called a macron, over a vowel indicates that it is pronounced long.)

Another case is the locative, which is used mostly with the names of cities (e.g.  'in Rome') and a very limited number of ordinary nouns (e.g.  'at home').

Examples of case use

The following examples from Caesar show the cases used in a basic sense:

'Caesar (Nom) gave a signal (Acc.) to the soldiers (Dat)'

Here  is the subject of the sentence, and so nominative case;  'to the soldiers' is dative case, a case typically used with the verb  'I give' (hence the name 'dative'); while  is the direct object, and so accusative case.

'Curio (Nom.) sends ahead Marcius (Acc.) to Utica (Acc.) with the ships (Abl.)'

Here  as subject of the verb is nominative,  as direct object is accusative;  is also accusative as it is the goal or object of motion; and  'with the ships' has the ablative ending. Although the ending -ibus is the same for both dative and ablative plural, the ablative meaning 'with' is more appropriate in this context.

'Pompey (Nom) from Luceria (Abl) sets out to Canusium (Acc)'

Here Pompeius is subject (Nom.), Lūceriā shows another meaning of the ablative ending, namely 'from', and Canusium is again accusative of goal. With names of cities there is no need to add a preposition such as  'to', but the accusative case alone indicates 'to'.

An example illustrating the genitive case is the following:

'the enemy (Nom.) hastened towards Caesar's (Gen.) camp (Acc.) with all their forces (Abl.)'

Here , the goal of motion, is in the accusative following the preposition  'to' or 'towards';  'of Caesar' or 'Caesar's' is in the genitive case; and  'with all their forces' is in the ablative case, with the meaning 'with'.

Idioms using the dative case
The description of the use of cases is not always straightforward. The classification of the uses of the dative alone takes up nearly twelve pages in Woodcock's A New Latin Syntax and ten pages in Gildersleeve and Lodge. For example, when asking someone's name, a Roman would say:
 (Plautus)
'what's your name?' (lit. 'what is for you the name?)

This is an example of the dative of possession, as in:
 (Plautus)
'he had two daughters' (lit. 'to him there were two daughters')

Another idiomatic use is the "dative of the person affected":
 (Plautus)
'I haven't stolen anything from you' (lit. 'for you';) 

The dative is also used with verbs of fighting with someone:
 (Catullus)
'don't fight with (lit. 'for') two people at once'

Another idiom is the "predicative dative" used with the verb 'to be' in phrases such as  'to be of use',  'to be a trouble (to someone)':

 (Cicero) 
'my arrival was a trouble or expense for no one'

Many verbs which in English take a direct object are used in Latin intransitively with a dative noun or pronoun, e.g.  'I persuade',  'I believe',  'I resist'.

 (Seneca)
'he did not persuade him (lit. 'for him')'
 (Nepos)
'he ordered him' ('gave an order to him')

Prepositions
Frequently, to make the meaning more precise, a noun in the accusative or ablative is preceded by a preposition such as   'in, into',  'to',  'with', or  'out of'. This is especially so if the noun refers to a person. For example:
 
 (Acc) 'to the king' (used with a verb of motion such as 'goes' or 'sends') 
 (Abl.) 'by the king', 'from the king'
 (Abl.) 'with him'
 (Abl.) 'from/out of the city'

However, when the meaning of an accusative or an ablative is clear (for example  (Acc) 'to Canusium',  (Abl) 'with the ships',  (Abl) 'on the following day'), the case ending alone is sufficient to give the meaning. Unlike in Greek, prepositions are not used in Latin with the dative or genitive.

Prepositions with accusative or ablative
Four prepositions can be followed by more than one case (very similar to usage of these and other prepositions in German), depending on their meaning. These are   'in' (Abl), 'into' (Acc.);  'under' (Abl.), 'to the foot of' (Acc.);  'over, above' (Acc.), 'concerning' (Abl.); and  'under' (usually with Acc.)
 (Acc) 'into the city' 
 (Abl) 'in the city' 

Position of prepositions
Prepositions almost always precede their noun or pronoun, except that  'with' follows a personal pronoun, e.g. There are occasional exceptions, especially with two-syllable prepositions after pronouns, e.g. (Virgil) 'in the midst of these'. 

Sometimes when the noun has an adjective it is placed before the preposition for emphasis, e.g. 'with great care' (Cicero), but this is not an invariable rule. Occasionally also the opposite order (noun-preposition-adjective) may be used in poetry and later prose, e.g.

Latin tenses

Latin has six main tenses in the indicative mood, which are illustrated below using the verb  'to make' or 'to do':
Present : faciō : 'I do', 'I am doing'
Future : faciam  (2nd person faciēs): 'I will do', 'I will be doing'
Imperfect : faciēbam : 'I was doing', 'I used to do', 'I began to do'
Perfect : fēcī : 'I did', 'I have done'
Future Perfect : fēcerō : 'I will have done'
Pluperfect : fēceram : 'I had done'

Some verbs (conjugations 1 and 2) instead of the Future -am, -ēs, -et etc. have a different future ending in -bō, -bis, -bit, e.g. amābō 'I will love'. 

To these six ordinary tenses may be added various "periphrastic" tenses, made from a participle and part of the verb sum 'I am', such as  'I was about to do'.

For the most part these tenses are used in a fairly straightforward way; however, there are certain idiomatic uses that may be noted. Note in particular that the Latin perfect tense combines the English simple past ("I did") with the present perfect ("I have done") into a single form; this can make the perfect verb "feel" like it is set in the present ("Now I have done (it)") for the purpose of grammatical sequence of tenses.

Passive and deponent verbs
Passive and deponent tenses
In addition to the active voice tenses listed above, Latin has a set of passive voice tenses as follows:
Present :  : 'I am captured', 'I am being captured' (by someone or something)
Future :  (2nd singular  or ) : 'I will be captured'
Imperfect :  : 'I was being captured', 'I used to be captured'
Perfect :  : 'I was captured', 'I have been captured'
Future Perfect :  : 'I will have been captured'
Pluperfect :  : 'I had been captured'

The three perfect tenses (Perfect, Future Perfect, and Pluperfect) are formed using the perfect participle together with part of the verb  'I am'. The ending of the participle changes according to the gender and number of the subject:  'he was captured';  'she was captured';  'they were captured', and so on.

Deponent verbs have exactly the same form as passive verbs except that the meaning is active, not passive:
Present :  : 'I enter', 'I am entering'
Future :  (2nd singular  or ) : 'I will enter'
Imperfect :  : 'I was entering, 'I used to enter'
Perfect :  : 'I entered', 'I have entered'
Future Perfect :  : 'I will have entered'
Pluperfect :  : 'I had entered'

The use of passive verbs
A passive verb is generally used when it is unnecessary to indicate who did the action:

'he offered himself to the enemy and was killed'

An intransitive verb can also be made passive, provided it is used impersonally in the neuter singular:
 (Livy)
'when (the army) reached the foot of the mountains, the signal was given at once'

 (Livy)
'the citadel has been captured by the enemy!'

When the agent is not a person but a thing, no preposition is used, but simply the ablative case:
 (Ovid)
'the earth is seized by flames (i.e. catches fire)'

Passive of 'give'
In Latin, unlike English, only the direct object (not the indirect object) of an active verb can be made the subject of a passive verb. It is not correct to say in Latin 'the soldiers were being given their pay' but only 'pay was being given to the soldiers': (Livy)
'pay was being given to the soldiers'

Impersonal passive
'they go into an ancient forest' (lit. 'going is done')  (Livy)
'on the seventh day they reached Carthage' (Cicero)
'Cluvius had been persuaded to lie' (literally: 'it had been persuaded to Cluvius that he should lie')

Passive infinitive
The infinitive of a passive verb ends in -ī (3rd conjugation) or -rī (other conjugations):  'to be captured,  'to be heard', etc. (Livy)
'he ordered him to be put in chains' (Seneca)
'if you wish to be loved, love'

The Perfect passive has an infinitive  'to have been captured', and there is also a rarely used Future passive infinitive made using the supine plus the passive infinitive :  'to be going to be captured'. It is typically used in indirect statements: (Cicero)
'I can see that he is going to get killed by Milo himself'

Deponent verbs
Most of the verbs ending in -or are true passives in meaning (i.e. they represent actions which are done by someone or by something). However, there are a few which are ambivalent and can be either active or passive in meaning, such as  'I turn' (intransitive) or 'I am turned',  'I revolve' (intransitive) or 'I am rolled':  (Virgil)
'meanwhile the sky turns and night falls upon the Ocean'

In addition, there are a few verbs such as  'I set out',  'I promise',  'I try' which despite their passive endings have an active meaning. These verbs (which have no active counterpart) are called deponent verbs: (Caesar)
'he himself set out for Italy'

Although most deponent verbs are intransitive, some of them such as  'I follow' can take a direct object: (Nepos)
'he ordered this man to follow him'

Deponent verbs are frequently used in their perfect participle form (e.g.  'having set out'):'after setting out at midnight, he reached the enemies' camp in the early morning'

The subjunctive mood
As well as the indicative mood illustrated above, which is used for stating and asking facts, and an imperative mood, used for direct commands, Latin has a subjunctive mood, used to express nuances of meaning such as 'would', 'could', 'should', 'may' etc. (The word mood in a grammatical sense comes from the Latin modus, and has no connection with the other meaning of 'mood', in the sense of 'emotional state', which comes from a Germanic root.)

Formation of the subjunctive
There are four tenses of the subjunctive, which in the verb  are as follows:
Present :  (2nd person ) : 'I may do', 'I would do', 'I should do' (also simply 'I do')
Imperfect :  : 'I would be doing', 'I should do' (in a past context) (also simply 'I was doing')
Perfect :  : 'I have done', 'I did'
Pluperfect :  : 'I would or should have done' (also 'I had done')

The present subjunctive of 1st conjugation verbs ends in -em instead of -am:  'I may love, I would love'.

The present subjunctive of the verbs  'I am',  'I am able',  'I want',  'I don't want' and  'I prefer', ends in -im:  'I may be, I would be',  'I may be able',  'I would like, I may wish', etc.

Uses of the subjunctive
The subjunctive has numerous uses, ranging from what potentially might be true to what the speaker wishes or commands should happen. It is often translated with 'should', 'could', 'would', 'may' and so on, but in certain contexts, for example indirect questions or after the conjunction  'when' or 'since', it is translated as if it were an ordinary indicative verb.

Often in English the subjunctive can be translated by an infinitive; for example,  (literally, 'he ordered that he should go') becomes in more idiomatic English 'he ordered him to go'.

Potential subjunctive
The 'potential' subjunctive is used when the speaker imagines what potentially may, might, would, or could happen in the present or future or might have happened in the past. The negative of this kind is : (Cicero)
'this may perhaps seem harsh' (Cicero)
'what if I had done this?''I couldn't easily say (= I don't think) that I have ever seen anything more beautiful'

Optative subjunctive
Another use is for what the speaker wishes may happen, or wishes had happened (the 'optative' subjunctive). The negative of this kind is : (Cicero)
'if only he were here already!' (Cicero)
'if only he had taken out all his forces with him!'

Jussive subjunctive
It can also represent what the speaker commands or suggests should happen (the 'jussive' subjunctive). The negative is again : (Catullus)
'let's live, my Lesbia, and let's love''you should not fear death'

In indirect statements and questions

One important use of the subjunctive mood in Latin is to indicate that the words are quoted; this applies for example to subordinate clauses in indirect speech: (Nepos)
'(he said that) they would easily find the place where he was'

It also applies to all indirect questions: (Catullus)
'perhaps you ask why I do this'

When used in indirect speech or in an indirect question, the subjunctive is translated as if were the corresponding tense of the indicative.

Subjunctive after conjunctions
The subjunctive mood is very frequently used in subordinate clauses following conjunctions.

After 

Used with the indicative, the conjunction  means 'at that time when', or 'whenever': (Cicero) 
'when they are silent, (it is as if) they are shouting'

Used with the subjunctive, however, it frequently means 'at a time when'. When  is used with the Imperfect subjunctive, a common way of translating it is 'while': (Cicero)
'while I was sitting sadly at home, Venerius suddenly came running up'

With the Pluperfect subjunctive, it often means 'after X happened': (Livy)
'after Antiochus had left Egypt, the ambassadors sailed to Cyprus'

It can also mean 'in view of the fact that' or 'since':'in view of the fact that these things are so' / 'since this is so'

Another, less common, meaning is 'though': (Cicero)
'he did nothing to help me, though (or: at a time when) he could have done'

After 
When followed by the indicative, the conjunction  can mean 'as' (e.g.  'as generally happens') or 'as soon as' or 'when' ( 'as soon as I came'). But with the subjunctive  has the meaning 'that' or 'so that'.

It can represent purpose ('so that he could...'): (Nepos)
'(Hannibal) came to Crete so that there he could consider (in order to consider) where he should go to next'

It can also be used to introduce an indirect command ('that he should...'): (Nepos)
'he ordered him to go round (lit. 'that he should go round') all the doors of the building'

It can also represent result (making what is known as a "consecutive" clause): (Nepos)
'and he had built it in such a way that in all parts of the building it had exits'

Occasionally  with the subjunctive can mean 'although'.

After 

After  'if', the subjunctive expresses an imagined or unreal situation: (Cicero)
'which, if I had been killed, could not have happened' (Cicero)
'if they were to come back to life and talk to you, what answer would you be making?'

After 
After  'that not', the subjunctive can express a negative purpose:
 (Nepos)
'so that he would not be able to escape from here, the ephors blocked up the doors'

It can also introduce a negative indirect command:
 (Nepos)
'Timoleon begged them all not to do this'

The conjunction  can also express a fear; in this case, the word 'not' must be omitted from the English translation:
 (Nepos)
'fearing that he might be handed over to the enemy'

After 
When used with the indicative, dum means 'while' or 'as long as'. But when followed by the subjunctive, it often means 'until': (Livy)
'Verginius waited until he had a chance to consult his colleague'

Another meaning is 'provided that': (Accius)
'let them hate, provided that they fear'

After 
The conjunctions  and  both mean 'before (something happened)'. If the event actually happened, the verb is usually in the indicative mood; but when the meaning is 'before there was a chance for it to happen', the verb is subjunctive: (Caesar)
'he fortified the hill quickly, before it could be noticed by the enemies'

After 
The conjunction  (literally, 'how should it not be?') is always used after a negative verb or the equivalent, typically 'there is no doubt that', 'who does not know that...?', and so on. The words following  are always positive and usually state what was actually the case: (Cicero)
'I have no doubt that all your friends will have written to you' (Cicero)
'who does not know that there are three kinds of Greeks?'

Another usage is after a negative verb such as 'I can't help doing' or 'he did not refrain from doing': (Cicero)
'I can't do otherwise than to thank you' (Cicero)
'Antiochus did not refrain from publishing a book against his own teacher'

Equally it can be used in sentences of the kind 'A didn't happen without B also happening': (Cicero)
'up to now I have not let a day go past without dropping you a line'

In sentences like the following, there is potential for confusion, since the quīn clause, though positive in Latin, is translated in English with a negative: (Caesar)
'there was not one of the soldiers who was not wounded' (Cicero)
'it was quite impossible that Cleomenes would not be spared'

In the following context, the words after  express not what actually happened but what very nearly happened: (Caesar)
'nor were they far from being expelled from the camp'

Subjunctive after  'who'
Generic
The pronoun  'who' or 'which', when followed by a subjunctive, can mean 'a person such as' (generic): (Cicero)
'he who obeys modestly, seems to be the sort of person who one day is worthy to rule'

Purpose
It can also mean 'in order to' (purpose): (Livy)
'they sent ambassadors to Rome to ask for help'

Explanatory
Another meaning is 'in view of the fact that' (giving an explanation), as in the following example, said jokingly of a consul who was elected on the last day of the year: (Cicero) 
'(Caninius) was of amazing vigilance, in view of the fact that he didn't see any sleep in the whole of his consulate!'

Reported speech
Another reason for using the subjunctive after  is to show that the words of the  clause are quoted or part of indirect speech: (Cicero)
'Paetus made a gift to me of all the books which his brother had left him'

Clearly here Paetus had written or stated "I am giving you all the books which my brother left me", and Cicero is quoting his words indirectly to Atticus.

The imperative mood
Present imperative
The imperative mood is used for giving direct orders. The active form can be made plural by adding -te:dā mī bāsia mīlle, deinde centum! (Catullus)
'give me a thousand kisses, then a hundred!'date dexterās fidemque! (Livy)
'give me your right hands and your oath!'

Deponent imperative
Deponent verbs such as  'I set out' or  'I follow' have an imperative ending in -re or -minī (plural):patent portae: proficīscere! (Cicero)
'the gates are open: depart!'sequiminī mē hūc intrō ambae (Terence)
'follow me this way inside, both of you'

Passive imperative
The passive imperative is almost never found. It has the same endings as the deponent imperative:neu bellī terrēre minīs (Virgil)
'and do not be terrified by threats of war!'

Negative commands
An imperative is usually made negative by using  (literally, 'be unwilling!') plus the infinitive. However, in poetry an imperative can sometimes be made negative with the particle nē: (Seneca the Elder)
'don't be surprised' (Virgil)
'do not terrify me, who am already scared, obscene birds!'

A negative order can also use the perfect subjunctive:  (Cicero)
'do not be afraid on my account'

Future imperative
 (Cicero)
'if anything happens, write to me'

This imperative is very common in early writers such as Plautus and Cato, but it is also found in later writers such as Martial:

 (Terence)
'when we have finished washing, get washed if you wish'.

 (Cato)
'if you eat it (cabbage) raw, dip it in vinegar.'

 (Martial)
'Laugh loudly at anyone who calls you camp, Sextillus, and stick up your middle finger at him.'

Some verbs have only the second imperative, for example  'know',  'remember'.
 (Pompey)
'know that I am now extremely anxious'

 (Cicero)
'but remember this'

3rd person imperative
A 3rd person imperative also ending in -tō, plural -ntō exists in Latin. It is used in very formal contexts such as laws: (Cicero)
'orders must be just, and citizens must obey them'

Other ways of expressing a command
Other requests are made with expressions such as  'take care to...',  'see to it that...' or  'be careful that you don't...' (Cicero)
'make sure you keep well'

The future indicative can be used for polite commands: (Cicero)
'will you please give my regards to Pilia and Attica?'

The infinitive

Although often referred to as a 'mood', the Latin infinitive is usually considered to be a verbal noun rather than a mood.

Latin has three infinitives in the active voice, and three passive.

Active:
Present :  : 'to capture, to be capturing'
Perfect :  : 'to have captured'
Future :  : 'to be going to capture'

Passive:
Present :  : 'to be captured'
Perfect :  : 'to have been captured'
Future :  : 'to be going to be captured'

Neither of these verbs has a Future infinitive, and the Present infinitive is used instead.

The Future infinitive is used only for indirect statements (see below).

The passive Future infinitive is rare, and is frequently replaced with a phrase using .

Uses of the infinitive
The infinitive can be used as the subject, complement, or the object of a verb: (Cicero)
'to live is to think' (Cicero)
'we consider to be in error, to be ignorant, to be deceived as something shameful'

Prolative infinitive
It can also be used, as in English, dependent on an adjective, or with verbs such as  'I am able' or  'I want': (Horace)
'it is a sweet and glorious thing to die for one's country' (Cicero)
'I can't bear it'

It is likewise used, as in English, with verbs such as  'I order',  'I forbid',  'I allow',  'I want' and so on, where the subject of the complement clause (sometimes mistakenly referred as an object) is in the accusative case:  (Cicero)
'I want you to know this'

'he is urging me to write to the senate' (lit. 'that I should write')

Historic infinitive
An infinitive is sometimes used to represent a series of repeated actions:
 (Cicero)
'everyone began shouting at once'

 (Bellum Africanum)
'meanwhile the enemy cavalry kept on patrolling round Caesar's defences'

Accusative and infinitive (indirect statement)

A very common use of the infinitive in Latin, in which it differs from English, is its use for indirect statements, that is for sentences where a subordinate clause is dependent on a main verb meaning 'he says', 'he knows', 'he pretends', 'he believes', 'he thinks', 'he finds out' and so on. In Latin, instead of 'they pretend that they want', the idiom is to say 'they pretend themselves to want': (Cicero)
'they pretend that they want peace'

Similarly 'I'm glad you've arrived safely' becomes 'I am glad you to have arrived safe': (Terence)
'I am glad you have arrived safely'

In this construction, the subject of the infinitive (in the above examples) is in the accusative case.

So common is this construction in Latin, that often the verb 'he said' is simply omitted if it is clear from the context, the accusative and infinitive alone making it clear that the statement is reported: (Livy)
'a terrible thing had happened (she said)'

The rule of tense in an accusative and infinitive construction is that the present infinitive is generally used for actions contemporary with the main verb, the perfect for actions which preceded it, and the future for actions which followed it. An example of the future infinitive using the future participle is the following:
 (Cicero)
'I hear [epistolary imperfect] that Valerius is going to come today'

Often the  part of a future active or perfect passive infinitive is omitted:
 (Seneca)
'he heard that his brother had been killed'

Less common is the periphrastic perfect infinitive, used when a potential pluperfect subjunctive is converted into an indirect statement:
 (Cicero)
'they say that Clodius would not have returned to Rome that day, if he had not heard about Cyrus'

The above example also illustrates another feature of indirect statement, that a negative indirect statement ('they say that ... not') is usually represented by the use of the main verb  'I deny'.

Other ways of expressing 'that'
Not every subordinate clause which starts with the conjunction 'that' in English is translated with an accusative and infinitive. In some contexts  with the subjunctive is required, for example after a verb of happening: (Nepos)
'it happened by chance that some ambassadors of King Prusias were dining in Rome'

In other circumstances a clause with quod 'the fact that' is used with the indicative: (Cicero)
'I omit the fact that he chose that house for himself' 

In less educated authors  could even substitute for the accusative an infinitive, though this did not become common until the second century:
 ([Caesar])
'the ambassadors reported that they had Pompey in their power'

Participles
Unlike Greek, Latin is deficient in participles, having only three, as follows:
Present :  (pl. ) : 'doing/making' or 'while doing/making'
Perfect :  : 'done' or 'having been made'
Future :  : 'going to do/make'

The Romans themselves considered the gerundive (see below) also to be a participle, but most modern grammars treat it as a separate part of speech:
Gerundive :  : 'needing to be made'

There is no active perfect participle in most verbs, but in deponent verbs, the perfect participle is active in meaning, e.g. , 'having set out'.

The verb  'I am' has no present or perfect participle, but only the Future participle  'going to be'. However the derived verb  'I am absent' has a present participle  'absent'.

Uses of participles
Adjectival participle
Participles have endings like those of adjectives, and occasionally they are used as though they were adjectives. If so, they refer to the state or condition that a thing or person is in:
 (Cicero)
'he was doused with boiling water'

 (Eutropius)
'he buried the dead (those who had been killed)'

Participle as a verb
More frequently, however, a participle is more like a verb, and if one action follows another, it can often replace the first of two verbs in a sentence:
 (Suetonius)
'Caesar grabbed Casca's arm and stabbed it with his writing instrument'

Literally, 'Caesar with writing instrument pierced for Casca the grabbed arm'

Participles can frequently be translated into English using a clause with 'when':

.
'and when her husband asked "Are you all right?", she said "No!"

 (Suetonius)
'and when he tried to leap forward he was slowed down (tardātus) by another wound'

'-ing' and 'who' are other possible translations:
 (Cicero)
'Lepta came running'

 (Livy)
'drawing his sword, he came to Lucretia, when she was sleeping / who was sleeping'

Apart from 'when' and 'who', other translations are possible, such as 'if', 'since', or 'although':
 (Cicero)
'although it can't see itself, the eye discerns other things'

A participle phrase can also stand for a noun clause, as in the following example:
 (Livy)
'they raised a sign from the wall that the town had been captured' (lit. 'of the town having been captured')

Normally a Present participle represents an action which is simultaneous with the main event ('he came running'), and a Perfect participle represents one which has already happened ('after drawing his sword'). In the following example, however, the Perfect participle represents the result following the main action:
 (Virgil)
'she tore her hair, making it loose'

Participles are much commoner in Latin than in English. Sometimes multiple participles can be used in a single sentence:
 (Cicero)
'in the night, in the light of a lamp placed nearby, the nurse, who had woken up, noticed that the boy, while he was sleeping, had been wrapped around with the coils of a snake; terrified by this sight, she raised a cry'

Ablative absolute
The phrase  (lit. 'with drawn sword') above is an example of a common idiom in which a noun and participle are put in the ablative case to represent the circumstances of the main event. This absolute construction in Latin is called an "ablative absolute" and is comparable to the Greek genitive absolute or the English nominative absolute. Other examples are:
 (Caesar)
'when the signal was given (lit. 'with signal given'), they made an attack on the enemy'
 (Virgil)
'but Father Aeneas, on hearing Turnus's name, immediately deserted the walls'

The present participle can also be used in an ablative absolute:

 (Cicero)
'but she, while we were listening, said "I am just a guest here myself!"'

 (Cicero)
'without their master ordering it, or knowing, or even present'

The verb  ('I am') has no participle, except in the compound forms  'absent' and  'present'. To make an ablative absolute with 'to be', the words are put in the ablative, and the verb is simply omitted:

 (Nepos)
'when I was a little boy'

 (Livy)
'when these men were consuls, Fidenae was besieged and Crustumeria captured'

The gerundive

The gerundive is a verbal adjective ending in -ndus (-nda etc. if feminine). It is usually passive in meaning (although a few deponent verbs can form an active gerund, such as  'following' from  'I follow'). The usual meaning of the gerundive is that it is necessary for something to be done. Often the word 'must' is a suitable translation: (Horace)
'now it is necessary to drink' (i.e. 'now we must celebrate') (Florus)
'Cato with implacable hatred used to declare that Carthage must be destroyed'

If a word is added to show by whom the action must be done, this word is put in the dative case (e.g.  'for us').

Because it is passive in meaning, the gerundive is usually formed from transitive verbs. However, intransitive verbs such as  'I go' and  'I persuade', which can be used passively in an impersonal construction, can also have an impersonal gerundive, ending in -um: (Cicero)
'It is necessary for me to go to Arpinum' / 'I have to go to Arpinum' (Quintilian)
'the judge has to be persuaded'

The gerundive after ad can also be used to express purpose (a use which it shares with the gerund, see below): (Caesar)
'they sent the military tribune Lucius Septimius to kill Pompey' (Nepos)
'Datames handed this man over in chains to Mithridates for him to be led to the King'

The gerund
The gerund is a verbal noun ending in -ndum (accusative), -ndī (genitive), or -ndō (dative or ablative). Although identical in form to a neuter gerundive, and overlapping the gerundive in some of its uses, it is possible that it has a different origin.

Gerunds are usually formed from intransitive verbs, and are mainly used in sentences such as the following where the meaning is 'by doing something', 'of doing something', or 'for the purpose of doing something'. A gerund is never used as the subject or direct object of a verb (the infinitive is used instead).
 (Livy)
'by coming here, you have saved the army'
 (Pliny the Elder)
'alkaline water is good for drinking'
 (Caesar)
'weather suitable (idōneam) for sailing'
 (Livy)
'for the sake of sacrificing, I climbed up to Delphi'

Occasionally a gerund can be made from a transitive verb and can take a direct object:
 (Cicero)
'by saying incongruous things laughs are raised'

They can also be formed from deponent verbs such as  'I enter':
 (Livy)
'for others fear of the enemy gave them the boldness to enter (lit. of entering) the river'

However, if the verb is transitive, a phrase made of noun + gerundive is often substituted for the gerund:
 (Seneca)
'dry wood is a suitable material for lighting fires'

The supine
The supine is a rarely used part of the verb ending in -tum or (in some verbs) -sum. When a verb is given in a dictionary with its four principal parts, such as  'I bring' or  'I send', the supine is the fourth part. 

The supine is identical in form with the accusative case of 4th declension verbal nouns such as  'arrival',  'movement',  'return', etc., but it differs from them in that it is a verb as well as a noun, and can sometimes take a direct object.

Supine in -um
The supine is normally used to express purpose, when combined with a verb of movement such as  'I go' or  'I send':
 (Horace)
'Maecenas went to play a game, Virgil and I to sleep'

 (Ovid)
'(the girls) come to watch, but they also come so that they can be looked at themselves'

In the following example it takes a direct object:
 (Caesar)
'they sent ambassadors to Caesar in order to ask for help'

The accusative of the supine is also used to make the rare future passive infinitive, for example,  'to be going to be captured', which can be used in indirect statements referring to the future (see above):
 (Cicero)
'I think the business will be completed before his return'

Supine in -ū
There is another form of the supine, an Ablative in -ū, found with certain verbs only. But this cannot take an object. It is used in phrases such as  'amazing to say',  'easy to do':
 (Livy)
'it is easier in the saying than in reality'

Bibliography
Devine, Andrew M. & Laurence D. Stephens (2006), Latin Word Order. Structured Meaning and Information. Oxford: Oxford University Press. Pp. xii, 639.  . Google books sample. See also reviews by M. Esperanza Torrego and Anne Mahoney.
Gildersleeve, B.L. & Gonzalez Lodge (1895). Gildersleeve's Latin Grammar. 3rd Edition. (Macmillan)
Greenough, J.B. et al. (1903). Allen and Greenough's New Latin Grammar for Schools and Colleges. Boston and London.
Hopper, Paul J. (1985). Review of Panhuis The Communicative Perspective in the Sentence: a study of Latin word order. Language 61-2, 1985, 466-470.
Kennedy, Benjamin Hall (1871). The Revised Latin Primer. Edited and further revised by Sir James Mountford, Longman 1930; reprinted 1962.
Kühner, Raphael; & Karl Stegmann (1912) [1879]. Ausführliche Grammatik der lateinischen SpracheLeumann, Manu; J.B. Hofmann, & Anton Szantyr (1977) [1926]. Lateinische Grammatik. Munich.
Nutting, Herbert C. (1920). "Notes on the Cum-Construction". The Classical Journal, Vol. 16, No. 1.
Panhuis, D.G.J. (1982) The Communicative Perspective in the Sentence: a study of Latin word order, Amsterdam–Philadelphia: John Benjamins.
Pinkster, Harm (1990), Latin Syntax and Semantics.
Pinkster, H. (2016). "Developments in Latin syntax after the publication of Szantyr (1965)". In P. Cordin, & A. Parenti (Eds.), Problemi e prospettive della linguistica storica: Atti del XL Convegno della Società Italiana di Glottologia: Trento, 22-24 ottobre 2015 (pp. 75–92). (Biblioteca della Società italiana di glottologia; Vol. 40). Editrice Il Calamo.
Rose, H.J. (1924). Review of J. Marouzeaux (1922), "L'Ordre des Mots dans la Phrase latine: I. Les Groupes nominaux". The Classical Review, vol. 38, issue 1-2.
Spevak, Olga (2010). Constituent Order in Classical Latin Prose. Studies in Language Companion Series (SLCS) 117. Amsterdam/Philadelphia: John Benjamins Publishing Company, 2010.  Pp. xv, 318.  . Reviewed by J.G.F. Powell in the Bryn Mawr Classical Review 
Spevak, Olga (2014). The Noun Phrase in Classical Latin Prose. Amsterdam studies in classical philology, 21.   Leiden; Boston:  Brill, 2014.  Pp. xiii, 377.  . Review by Patrick McFadden.
Walker, Arthur T. (1918) "Some Facts of Latin Word Order". The Classical Journal, Vol. 13, No. 9, pp. 644–657.
Woodcock, E.C. (1959), A New Latin Syntax.

References

External links
University of Chicago Perseus under PhiloLogic searchable corpus. Perseus under PhiloLogic home page
Online version of Allen & Greenough's Latin Grammar
Online version of Gildersleeve & Lodge's Latin Grammar

Latin grammar